"Reap the Wild Wind" is Ultravox's first single from the Quartet album, recorded in Air Studios, in London and Montserrat and released on Chrysalis Records on 16 September 1982. 

"Reap the Wild Wind" was also the opening song for Ultravox when they performed at the 1985 Live Aid concert.

Midge Ure said in 2018: "'Reap the Wild Wind' is all about the melody and the rhythm of the song. We used the words and the voice, as a rhythmic sound, almost like an instrument itself. But actually, most of my old songs  is a canvas of words. One line does not necessarily connect to the next. Take "Reap the Wild Wind" - it's really not about anything at all!"

The promo video was directed by Midge Ure and Chris Cross.

It is the only single of its album that charted on the US Billboard Hot 100.

Track listing

7" version
 "Reap the Wild Wind" – 3:44
 "Hosanna (In Excelsis Deo)" – 4:21

12" version
 "Reap the Wild Wind" (Extended Version) – 4:43
 "Hosanna (In Excelsis Deo)" – 4:21

Chart performance

References

1982 singles
Ultravox songs
Songs written by Midge Ure
Songs written by Warren Cann
Songs written by Chris Cross
Songs written by Billy Currie
Song recordings produced by George Martin
Chrysalis Records singles
1982 songs